Sören Eismann (born 28 June 1988) is a German professional footballer who plays for TSV Steinbach, as a midfielder.

He became internationally famous for scoring a ruthlessly opportunistic goal against Meppen on 16 September 2017, stealing the ball off a player who intended to stop play to take care of an injured Jena player.

Career
Eismann made his professional debut in the 3. Liga against 1. FC Heidenheim 1846 on 24 July 2010, as a substitute for Tobias Kurbjuweit.

Controversy
On 16 September 2017, during a 3. Liga match between his side Carl Zeiss Jena and SV Meppen, Eismann scored a controversial goal, after he ignored appeals for stopping the game as his own teammate was lying on the field, after colliding with an adversary. Eismann's teammate, Julian Guenther-Schmidt, went down after a challenge and raised his hand in apparent pain, prompting Meppen midfielder Nico Granatowski to stop the ball as if to kick it out of play so the Jena forward could get attention. But Eismann got the ball, burst forward, and scored while the Meppen players stood around, seemingly expecting the ball to be sent out of play. The goal was given amid heated discussion and pushing and shoving among rival players. To add insult to injury, Eismann salvaged a draw with a late equaliser.

References

External links
 

1988 births
Living people
People from Rudolstadt
People from Bezirk Gera
German footballers
Footballers from Thuringia
Association football midfielders
FC Carl Zeiss Jena players
Holstein Kiel players
TuS Heeslingen players
Hallescher FC players
TSV Steinbach Haiger players
3. Liga players
Regionalliga players